Archolaemus orientalis is a species of glass knifefish endemic to Brazil where it is found in the upper Rio São Francisco basin. .

References

Sternopygidae
Fish of South America
Fish of Brazil
Taxa named by Donald J. Stewart
Taxa named by Richard Peter Vari
Taxa named by Carlos David Canabarro Machado de Santana
Taxa named by Wolmar B. Wosiacki
Fish described in 2012